Simon John Stapleton (born 10 December 1968) is an English former professional footballer who played as a midfielder. He spent the majority of his career at Wycombe Wanderers.

Born in Oxford, Stapleton started his career as an apprentice at Portsmouth, before joining Bristol Rovers in 1988, where he made his Football League debut. He joined Conference side Wycombe Wanderers in 1989, where he helped the team win promotion to the Football League in 1992–93. During the same season, Wycombe also reached the final of the FA Trophy, but Stapleton did not play after failing a late fitness test.

After making 49 League appearances for the club, he left Wycombe in 1996 and went on to have brief spells with non-League clubs Slough Town and Rushden & Diamonds. He finished his career with Stevenage Borough, where he played against Premier League side Newcastle United in the fourth round of the 1997–98 FA Cup.

Honours
Wycombe Wanderers
FA Trophy: 1990–91

References

External links
 Simon Stapleton at Post War English & Scottish Football League A - Z Player's Transfer Database
 

1968 births
Living people
English footballers
Portsmouth F.C. players
Bristol Rovers F.C. players
Wycombe Wanderers F.C. players
English Football League players
Slough Town F.C. players
Association football midfielders
Rushden & Diamonds F.C. players
Stevenage F.C. players